Rachel Stoyanov (born 14 March 2003) is a Bulgarian rhythmic gymnast. She formerly represented North Macedonia in individual competition until 2021, when she joined the Bulgarian group. In 2022 she won gold medal with The Bulgarian team in All-around at the world championship in Sofia and become a World Champion. She won gold medal in the finals with 3 ribbons+2 balls. She is European champion with the Bulgarian team event of the 2022 European Championships in Tel Aviv.

Career 
Of Bulgarian parents, she was born in the United States. She started practicing rhythmic gymnastics at the age of 4, when her mother took her to the Levski Club in Sofia, where Neshka Robeva trained her. Although she lived and trained in Bulgaria, she chose to represent North Macedonia as an individual rhythmic gymnast since junior.

Junior
She participated at the 2018 Rhythmic Gymnastics European Championships as a junior gymnast : she become 15th in the Individual All-Around competition.

2019
In her first year in the senior category Rachel participated in the Ritam Cup, in Serbia, where she obtained bronze in the all around.

Her first appearance in the senior category and in the FIG World Cup Series was the World Cup Pesaro.That same year she participated in Sofia and the Baku World Cups, and in the World Cup Challenge in Cluj-Napoca. She also participated in the 2019 Rhythmic Gymnastics European Championships in Baku, Azerbaijan where she become 42 in the All around. Rachel participated in her first world championship, the 2019 World Championships in Baku, Azerbaijan, the same venue as the European one, where she was ranked 68th in the all around.

2020
In february, Rachel participated in the Irina Deleanu Cup in Bucharest, Romania, where she placed eighth in the all-around. 

Due to the Covid-19 pandemic, Rachel was unable to compete in the FIG World Cup series, which were cancelled. In October, she participated in the International RG Online Tournament in Moscow organized by Irina Viner where she obtained ninth place and the silver medal with the hoop. She also participated in the International Online Tournament of Julieta Shishmanova, where she obtained silver in the all around. 

At the end she participated in the 2020 Rhythmic Gymnastics European Championships in Kyiv, Ukraine where she obtained 16th place in the All Around

2021 

Rachel achieved very good results in 2021, she participated in the 4 World Cups, the same ones that were postponed from 2020 due to the pandemic (and that served as a qualification for the Tokyo 2020 Olympic Games) she participated in the Sofia World Cup in March, Tashkent (her best position) and Baku in April, and Pesaro in May.

In June, Rachel participated in the 2021 Rhythmic Gymnastics European Championships in Varna, Bulgaria , where she made it to the top 24 all-around final and become the first gymnast from North Macedonia to do so.  She also had the opportunity to fight for the last remaining place to enter the Olympic Games, the European continental square, was ranked 23rd in the final and did not obtain the square. She also won the prize “Rising star” .

2022 

At the end of the 2021 season, Rachel was selected to compete with the Bulgarian group, led by Vesela Dimitrova and her assistant Mihaela Maevska. In February 2022, the International Gymnastics Federation (FIG) approved her change of nationality to represent Bulgaria and leave North Macedonia.

Although the first competition of the Bulgarian group was in March, at the Grand Prix in Marbella, Rachel was selected to compete from the World Cup Challenge in Pamplona in May, where they obtained fourth place in the all-around, fifth in the 5-ring final and the silver medal in the mixed final, with 3 ribbons and 2 balls. In June they competed in the World Cup in Pesaro, where the Bulgarian group won the silver medal all around and the mixed final, also the bronze medal in the 5 hoops final. She was selected to compete at 2022 Rhythmic Gymnastics European Championships in Tel Aviv, Israel with the group along with Zhenina Trashlieva, Sofia Ivanova, Kamelia Petrova, Vaya Draganova and Margarita Vasileva, finishing 4th in the AA and 5-hoops final, and 6th in the mixed ending. The Bulgarian team also won the team gold, made up of the group and the individual Boryana Kaleyn and Stiliana Nikolova. 

They also participated in the last World Cup of the year in August and the last competition before the World Championship, the World Cup Challenge in Cluj-Napoca where the Bulgarian group won gold overall and in the 5 hoops and mixed final.

In September 2022, Rachel along with the Bulgarian group consisting of Sofia Ivanova, Kamelia Petrova, Radina Tomova, Zhenina Trashlieva and Margarita Vasileva, participated in the 2022 Rhythmic Gymnastics World Championships in Sofia, Bulgaria, where they won AA gold and in the mixed final and obtained the qualification to the Olympic Games in Paris 2024. Also, since 2014, Bulgaria has not won a World Championship together.

References

2003 births
Living people
Bulgarian rhythmic gymnasts
Medalists at the Rhythmic Gymnastics European Championships
Medalists at the Rhythmic Gymnastics World Championships